"This Light Between Us" is a song by Dutch disc jockey and producer Armin van Buuren with vocals from English singer and songwriter Christian Burns. It was released on 13 December 2010 in the Netherlands as the third single from van Buuren's fourth studio album, Mirage, and as the first single from Burns' first studio album, Simple Modern Answers.

Music video 
The music video was released to Armada Music's YouTube channel on 25 November 2010. It is a live recording from the Armin Only: Mirage concert on 13 November 2010 in the Jaarbeurs in Utrecht. The video includes the Metropool Orchestra playing and Christian Burns singing live in front of 15.000 visitors.

Track listing 
US digital download 
 "This Light Between Us"  – 3:17
 "This Light Between Us" – 5:19

Netherlands digital download 
 "This Light Between Us"  – 7:22
 "This Light Between Us"  – 6:27
 "This Light Between Us"  – 7:02
 "This Light Between Us"  – 5:09

Netherlands 12" 
 "This Light Between Us"  – 7:22
 "This Light Between Us"  – 6:27
 "This Light Between Us"  – 7:02
 "This Light Between Us"  – 5:09

Charts

Weekly charts

Year-end charts

References 

2010 songs
2010 singles
Armin van Buuren songs
Songs written by Armin van Buuren
Armada Music singles
Songs written by Benno de Goeij
Christian Burns songs
Songs written by Christian Burns